Dana Island refers to several islands in Indonesia and one island in Turkey
Dana Island, an island in Mersin Province of Turkey
Dana Island (Sabu Raijua), an island in Sabu Raijua Regency of Indonesia
Dana Island (Rote Ndao), in East Nusa Tenggara province of Indonesia